Danur 2: Maddah is a 2018 Indonesian supernatural horror film directed by Awi Suryadi and written by Lele Laila. The film stars Prilly Latuconsina, Sandrinna Michelle and Shawri Adrian Khulafa in leading roles with Sophia Latjuba,  Bucek Depp, and Gama Haritz in supporting roles. The film is the sequel to the 2017 film Danur: I Can See Ghosts, and is followed by Danur 3: Sunyaruri in 2019.

Plot 
A year after the bedlams of her revisit to her early life house, Risa lives with Riri in addition to Peter, William, and Janshen, at Bandung. Due to Elly going to foreign places to meet along with her husband, they generally visit their aunt Tina's residence. Tina lives along with her husband Ahmad and son Angki. Riri, a ballet rookie, enrages whilst Risa shouts amidst her stage overall performance, as there is a ghost behind her. Meanwhile, Peter, William, and Janshen meet fellow ghost friends Hendrick and Hans.

Risa slowly turns suspicious towards Ahmad, who unexpectedly turned introvert, in addition to regularly scattering tuberose vases everywhere in the residence. Risa spots Ahmad taking walks with a woman, soaking up scents of infidelity to her. Strange matters occur for the duration of the residence as properly; its climax influences Tina as she turns into traumatized assembly with a ghost, mandating her to be hospitalized. At the sanatorium, Risa meets a corpse purifier who additionally has the ability to engage with ghosts; he explains that foxy ghosts can select whether or no longer their danur is capable of getting in contact with a human's senses, suggesting she exercise madah, that's to deepen one's powers.

Sick with the current familial occasions, Angki urges Risa to use her 6th sense to know what is actually taking place. Risa opens her frame for a ghost; the ghost tells Angki that no longer long later she will kill Ahmad. Risa shows Angki a diary she took from Ahmad's days in the past. In it, Ahmad claims to worship a female named Elizabeth, who will soon begin her twenty-third birthday; Ahmad plans to "meet" with her. Observing Elizabeth's photograph, Ahmad notes that she is the same as Ahmad's ex-female friend. Gathering the diary and a peculiar photo Riri located days in the past, Risa suspects that Elizabeth is a 1903-born Dutch girl who plans to kill Ahmad in an alternate for a brand new spouse. Risa rushes and saves Ahmad, tearing all pix of any Dutch ladies within the residence. Ahmad is later possessed; Risa is helped with the aid of her pals to rescue Ahmad from Elizabeth simply as she is horrified by a close to-death revel in. After the rescue, Ahmad is going and tears up the book as a way to ravage Elizabeth's spirit.

Arrived domestic, Risa's ghost friends introduce her to Ivanna, one of the Dutch women she noticed in an image. Ivanna explains that her brother, Dimas, changed into Elizabeth's boyfriend. Dimas is killed by Elizabeth's father who did not believe their relationship, and Ivanna cuts off her family from Elizabeth's on account of that then.

On an unknown date, Risa, her pals, Tina, Ahmad, and Angki visit the theater to watch Riri's ballet performance. Risa sees Canting, the theater's ghost.

Cast
 Prilly Latuconsina as Risa
 Gama Haritz as Peter
 Alexander P Bain as William
 Kevin Bzezovski Taroreh as Janshen Boek
 Matthew White as Hendrick
Justin Rosi as Hans
 Sandrinna Michelle as Riri
 Sophia Latjuba as Tina
 Shareefa Daanish as Asih
 Risa Saraswati as Doctor

References

External links 
 

Indonesian horror thriller films
Indonesian supernatural horror films
2018 films
2018 horror films
Indonesian ghost films
Indonesian sequel films
Films directed by Awi Suryadi